Kahi is a village and union council in Hangu District of Khyber Pakhtunkhwa. It is located at 33°28'28N 70°51'37E and has an altitude of 982 metres (3225 feet).

See also
 Kahi railway station

References

Union councils of Hangu District
Populated places in Hangu District, Pakistan